is a 1982 Japanese comedy film directed by Yoji Yamada. It stars Kiyoshi Atsumi as Torajirō Kuruma (Tora-san), and Ayumi Ishida as his love interest or "Madonna". Hearts and Flowers for Tora-san is the twenty-ninth entry in the popular, long-running Otoko wa Tsurai yo series.

Synopsis
During his travels, Tora-san gets drunk with an old man in Kyoto. Though Tora-san never fully comprehends his importance, the old man is a Living National Treasure ceramist. At his home, Tora-san makes a good impression on the old man's maid, who apparently falls in love with Tora-san.

Cast
 Kiyoshi Atsumi as Torajirō
 Chieko Baisho as Sakura
 Ayumi Ishida as Kagari
 Nizaemon Kataoka as Kanō
 Shimojo Masami as Kuruma Tatsuzō
 Chieko Misaki as Tsune Kuruma (Torajiro's aunt)
 Gin Maeda as Hiroshi Suwa
 Hidetaka Yoshioka as Mitsuo Suwa
 Hisao Dazai as Boss (Umetarō Katsura)
 Gajirō Satō as Genkō
 Chishū Ryū as Gozen-sama
 Akira Emoto as Kondō

Critical appraisal
Ayumi Ishida was nominated for Best Actress, and Akira Emoto for Best Supporting Actor at the Japan Academy Prize for their roles in Hearts and Flowers for Tora-san. Long-time composer for the series, Naozumi Yamamoto, was nominated for Best Music Score. Enomoto won the award for Best Supporting Actor at the Blue Ribbon Awards.
Stuart Galbraith IV writes that the film "is no better than average for this series, but then again this series' average is awfully high." He notes that this is the first episode in the series in which Tora-san's nephew Mitsuo plays a significant role in the plot. The German-language site molodezhnaja gives Hearts and Flowers for Tora-san three and a half out of five stars.

Availability
Hearts and Flowers for Tora-san was released theatrically on August 7, 1982. In Japan, the film was released on videotape in 1986 and 1996, and in DVD format in 2002 and 2008.

References

Notes

Bibliography
English
 
 
 
 

German
 

Japanese

External links

 Hearts and Flowers for Tora-san at www.tora-san.jp (official site)

1982 films
Films directed by Yoji Yamada
1982 comedy films
1980s Japanese-language films
Otoko wa Tsurai yo films
Shochiku films
Films set in Kamakura
Films set in Shiga Prefecture
Films set in Nagano Prefecture
Films set in Kyoto Prefecture
Films with screenplays by Yôji Yamada
1980s Japanese films